Inocybe tricolor is a rare member of the genus Inocybe that is widely distributed in temperate forests.  It is a small mycorrhizal mushroom that contains the hallucinogens psilocybin and psilocin. Inocybe tricolor is found under Norway spruce in central Europe.

Description
Cap:  Brick red to chocolate brown, lighter towards the margin, convex to umbonate, with a fibrillose to squamulose cap.  Usually less than 4 cm across and has incurved margin until very mature.
Gills: adnate and very numerous, pale cream brown to yellowish tan.
Spores: Smooth and ellipsoid to oval, measuring 7.5 x 4.5 micrometres, ochre to tan brown.
Stipe: 2.5–6 cm long, 4 to 6 mm thick, and is equal width for the whole length, sometimes with some swelling at the base.

See also
List of Inocybe species

References

External links
Inocybe tricolor picture
Inocybe tricolor picture

Psychoactive fungi
Psychedelic tryptamine carriers
tricolor
Fungi described in 1955
Fungi of Europe